Borden is an unincorporated community in southwestern Colorado County, Texas, located 4 miles northeast of Weimar.

The community was known as Harvey's Creek Settlement before the U.S. Civil War. After the war ended, Gail Borden returned to Texas, and at what would become Borden, built houses for himself, his brother, and his sons. He renamed the settlement Bordenville. The Galveston, Harrisburg and San Antonio Railway opened its line through the Borden area in 1872.

In 2000, Borden had 60 residents.

Government and infrastructure
The area post office opened on January 19, 1874, and John P. Borden became the postmaster. In 1905 the post office closed and mail was rerouted through Weimar.

In 1938, the Texas Highway Department announced plans to construct a lake and roadside park in Borden. They are the only visible infrastructure of years gone by in Borden. The lake was to be constructed along US 90, then called the Houston-San Antonio State Highway No. 3. The Feb. 18, 1938,  Eagle Lake Headlight announced that the new seven-acre lake “destined to become one of the main attractions", along the Houston-San Antonio highway. Work began on the project by February, 1938, with "a modest beginning as a roadside park,” according to the Headlight. The lake was to be placed about a quarter mile from what was the existing highway and directly west of State Highway 3, which eventually became Interstate 10. State Highway 3 bypassed Borden at what is now Hatterman Lane. A creek then running through the site was to be dammed to fill the lake. "Workmen are busy now in damming up the creek, pulling down a hill in this vicinity, and utilizing [sic] dirt from this elsewhere to form banks for the new lake," M.B. Hodges, state highway division engineer from Yoakum told the Headlight in 1938. Initial plans for the lake included eventual stocking with fish, and a multiyear moratorium on fishing prior to opening the lake to sports enthusiasts.

Education
During the boom times of the 1870s, Borden also built a school for white children and a freedmen's school for black children. The Weimar Independent School District serves Borden. In 1948, the Borden area schools were consolidated into the Weimar Independent School District.

References

External links

Unincorporated communities in Colorado County, Texas
Unincorporated communities in Texas